Finishing Move Inc. are a video game music production and composer team formed by Brian Trifon and Brian Lee White. The duo has composed soundtracks for several video game titles including, The Callisto Protocol, Grounded, Borderlands 3, Microsoft Flight Simulator, Crackdown 3, Halo Wars 2, and Massive Chalice.

They won Best Original Instrumental for “Halo 2 Anniversary” at the 2015 Game Audio Network Guild (G.A.N.G.) Awards and was nominated that same year in the following categories: Music of the Year, Best Original Soundtrack Album, Best Original Vocal Song Pop, and Best Audio Mix.

In 2017, they were nominated for The Hollywood Music in Media Awards for Original Score - Video Game for their work on Halo Wars 2. The real-time strategy video game also got Trifon and White nominations for Best Interactive Score, Best Cinematic Cutscene Audio, and Best Audio Mix at the G.A.N.G. Awards in 2018.

In 2019, they were nominated for The Hollywood Music in Media Awards for Original Score - Video Game for their work on Borderlands 3.

Awards and nominations

External links 
Official Website for Finishing Move Inc.
Brian Lee White on IMDb
Brian Trifon on IMDb
"Top Score: Brutal honesty brings success on 'Massive Chalice"
"How the Music to Videogame ‘Halo Wars 2’ Was Made the Old-Fashioned Way"

References 

Video game musicians
Living people
Year of birth missing (living people)